Til Jail Do Us Part is an American streaming television series created by José Luis Acosta. It premiered on Peacock on 15 September 2022.

Cast 
 Kate del Castillo as Ángela
 Roselyn Sánchez as Sofía
 Sylvia Sáenz as Viri
 Jeimy Osorio as Esme
 Matias Novoa as Pablo
 Rodrigo Murray as Suazo
 Iván Arana as Miguel
 Mauricio Isaac as Sebas
 Jessica Lindsey as Daniela
 Julieta Egurrola as Enriqueta
 Héctor Suárez Gomis as Alberto
 Xabiani Ponce De León as Leo
 Alejandra Zaid as Marta
 Vanessa Díaz as Elena
 Jamila Hache as Ana
 Francisco Angelini as Max
 Leonrdo Ortizgris as Carlos
 Anthony Álvarez as Tigre
 Polo Monarrez as Vergara

Episodes

Production

Development 
On 17 September 2019, it was announced that Armas de mujer was in development for NBC's planned streaming service, Peacock. Filming of the series began on 6 February 2021 and wrapped in April of that same year.

Casting 
In January 2020 Kate del Castillo was cast in a leading role for the series. On 6 February 2021, Matias Novoa was cast in a main role. On 12 February 2021, Roselyn Sánchez, Sylvia Sáenz and Jeimy Osorio were cast in leading roles. On 27 April 2021, Anthony Álvarez was cast in a main role.

Release 
The series premiered on 15 September 2022 on Peacock. HBO Max has acquired the exclusive broadcast rights to release the show in Latin America.

References

External links 
 

2020s American television series
2022 American television series debuts
Spanish-language television shows
Peacock (streaming service) original programming
Telemundo original programming